Suarta Rechi (born 9 November 2000), also known as Suarta Dervishi in some sources, is a Macedonian footballer who plays as a goalkeeper for 1.liga club Žfk As Junajted and the North Macedonia national team.

International career
Suarta Rechi has played Champion Women's League with team : Žfk Istatov North Macedonia. 
 
Friendly games, Tournaments and Qualitifications for :
National team of Macedonia U17 - 24 games.
National team of Macedonia U19 - 25 games, 
and she is part of A national team of North Macedonia since 2019.

Rechi made her debut for the North Macedonia national team on 17 September 2021, against England. North Macedonia lost the match 8–0 but Rechi did receive some praise for her performance.

References

External links
 Profile at UEFA

2000 births
Living people
Women's association football goalkeepers
Macedonian women's footballers
North Macedonia women's international footballers